Xiaoli is a town in Rongcheng County in central Hebei province, China, located around  southwest of the county seat and  northeast of downtown Baoding. , it has 10 villages under its administration.

See also 
 List of township-level divisions of Hebei

References 

Township-level divisions of Hebei
Rongcheng County